Yamunanagar district is one of the 22 districts of the Indian state of Haryana. Yamunanagar town is the district headquarters.

Yamunanagar's average rainfall in Monsoon is 892 mm, which is higher than the state average, which is 462 mm for Haryana.

The district is bounded by Himachal Pradesh state in the north, by Uttar Pradesh state in the east, by Karnal district in the south, by Kurukshetra district in the southwest and Ambala district in the west.

Divisions
The district is divided into 3 sub divisions: Jagadhri, Radaur and Bilaspur. There are 4 tehsils: Jagadhri, Chhachhrauli, Radaur and Bilaspur. These are further divided into 7 development blocks: Bilaspur, Sadhaura, Radaur, Jagadhri, Chhachhrauli, Saraswati Nagar and Partap Nagar.
There are 4 Vidhan Sabha constituencies in the district: Sadhaura, Jagadhri, Yamuna Nagar and Radaur. While Sadhaura, Jagadhri and Yamuna Nagar are part of Ambala Lok Sabha constituency, Radaur is part of Kurukshetra Lok Sabha constituency.

Demographics

According to the 2011 census Yamunanagar district has a population of 1,214,205, roughly equal to the nation of Bahrain or the US state of New Hampshire. This gives it a ranking of 393rd in India (out of a total of 640). Its population growth rate over the decade 2001–2011 was  16.56%. Yamuna Nagar has a sex ratio of 877 females for every 1,000 males, and a literacy rate of 78.9%. Scheduled Castes make up 25.26% of the population.

Languages 

At the time of the 2011 Census of India, 88.28% of the population in the district spoke Hindi, 7.24% Punjabi, 1.75% Haryanvi and 1.20% Urdu as their first language.

Major cities and towns
Yamunanagar, a municipal corporation and district headquarters of Yamunanagar
Jagadhri, located adjacent to Yamunanagar, is older of the twin cities.
Chhachhrauli
Bilaspur
 Radaur

Geography and Climate 
Yamunanagar district is situated on north-eastern tip of Haryana. It is bounded by Himachal Pradesh on northern side and Uttar Pradesh on eastern side. Land is plain with Siwalik hills on northern side, some high cliffs can also be found on northern side.

Month 	Rainfall (mm)
January	  28.0 
February  28.1
March	  22.5 
April	  21.7
May	  38.9
June 	  128.0
July 	  372.0 
August	  343.7
September 150.9
October	  19.0
November  12.5
December  17.8

Notes

External links
  Yamuna Nagar district website

 
Districts of Haryana
1989 establishments in Haryana